Latin American Youth Center (LAYC) is a non-governmental organization founded in 1968 in the Washington DC metropolitan area. Initially created to empower Latino youth, it later expanded its mission to include youth of all races with the aim of empowering low-income young people and their families to "achieve a successful transition to adulthood through multi-cultural, comprehensive and innovative programs that address youths' social, academic and career needs."

Population served

LAYC serves more than 4,000 young people, including low-income teen parents and homeless youth. Its primary purpose is to provide support for their studies and assistance in earning their GED certificates.

In 2016, DC approved the Ending Youth Homelessness Act and created two drop-in centers; one of them, in Columbia Heights (a few blocks from Columbia Heights station) is managed by LAYC. Youth can go during daytime to take a shower, eat a meal, wash their clothes and study for GED tests without any appointment. Regardless or their appearance or state of sobriety, they will receive substance abuse counseling, HIV testing, mental-health care, and housing referrals.

Budget 

LAYC is supported by the District of Columbia, and two Maryland counties - Prince George and Montgomery. It also receives fundraising from other investors such as Venture Philanthropy Partners. In 2015 LAYC's budget was US$15,807,189.

Program services 

LAYC programs focus on social services, community wellness, education, workforce investment and social enterprise, arts and media programs, among others.

The LAYC Career Academy is a program to support and provide resources for young people to study for their GED certificate or to help them enter a career of their choosing.

See also
 Office of Latino Affairs of the District of Columbia
 Hispanics in Washington, D.C.
 General Educational Development
 Mayor of the District of Columbia
 Hispanic and Latino Americans
 Arts and culture of Washington, D.C.
 GALA Hispanic Theatre

References

External links
 Latin American Youth Center (official site)
 Latin American Youth Center (Faacebok)
 Latin American Youth Center (Twitter)
 Latin American Youth Center (Google+)
 Latin American Youth Center (Youtube)
 Latin American Youth Center (Instagram)

Downtown Silver Spring, Maryland
Columbia Heights, Washington, D.C.
Hispanic and Latino American culture in Maryland
Hispanic and Latino American culture in Washington, D.C.
Montgomery County, Maryland
Riverdale Park, Maryland
Youth organizations based in Washington, D.C.